Zhanjiang Tiandi No.1 FC  (Simplified Chinese: 湛江天地壹号足球俱乐部) was an association football club located in Zhanjiang, Guangdong, China.

History
Guangdong Tiandi Food Group (sister company of Tiandi No.1 Beverage) invested  to found this club in 2007. Tiandi No.1 FC was the first professional football club in Zhanjiang's history.

References

External links
 Guangdong Tiandi No.1 fan club blog
 Guangdong Tiandi No.1 food group official website, archived

Defunct football clubs in China
Football clubs in China
Sports teams in Guangdong
2007 establishments in China